Marginella chalmersi is a species of colorful small sea snail, a marine gastropod mollusk in the Marginellidae family. This species is endemic to São Tomé and Príncipe.

References

chalmersi
Endemic fauna of São Tomé and Príncipe
Invertebrates of São Tomé and Príncipe
Gastropods described in 1912
Taxonomy articles created by Polbot